Hylocomium umbratum is a species of moss belonging to the family Hylocomiaceae.

It is native to Europe and Northern America.

References

Hypnales